Events from 2020 in Guam.

Incumbents 

 Governor: Lou Leon Guerrero
 Lieutenant Governor: Josh Tenorio

Events 
Ongoing – COVID-19 pandemic in Guam

 February 7 – The Government denied the entry request by the cruise ship , which had potentially infected passengers.

Deaths

References 

2020 in Guam
2020s in Guam
Years of the 21st century in Guam
Guam